Hilda Gustaava Herrala (8 April 1881 - 16 July 1956) was a Finnish seamstress and politician, born in Kuivaniemi. She was a member of the Parliament of Finland from 1908 to 1913, from 1916 to 1918 and from 1933 to 1936, representing the Social Democratic Party of Finland (SDP). During the 1918 Finnish Civil War Herrala was a member of the Central Workers' Council of Finland. After the war he was in prison until 1919.

References

1881 births
1956 deaths
People from Ii
People from Oulu Province (Grand Duchy of Finland)
Social Democratic Party of Finland politicians
Members of the Parliament of Finland (1908–09)
Members of the Parliament of Finland (1909–10)
Members of the Parliament of Finland (1910–11)
Members of the Parliament of Finland (1911–13)
Members of the Parliament of Finland (1916–17)
Members of the Parliament of Finland (1917–19)
Members of the Parliament of Finland (1933–36)
20th-century Finnish women politicians
Women members of the Parliament of Finland
People of the Finnish Civil War (Red side)
Prisoners and detainees of Finland